
Gmina Biała is a rural gmina (administrative district) in Wieluń County, Łódź Voivodeship, in central Poland.

Villages
Gmina Biała contains the villages and settlements of Biała Parcela, Biała Pierwsza, Biała Rządowa, Biała-Kopiec, Brzoza, Huby, Janowiec, Klapka, Kopydłów, Łyskornia, Młynisko, Naramice, Radomina, Rososz, Śmiecheń, Wiktorów and Zabłocie.

Neighbouring gminas
Gmina Biała is bordered by the gminas of Czarnożyły, Czastary, Łubnice, Lututów, Skomlin, Sokolniki and Wieluń.

References

Polish official population figures 2006

Biala
Wieluń County